Rötha is a town in the Leipzig district, in Saxony, Germany. It is situated 16 km south of Leipzig. On 1 August 2015 it was expanded with the former municipality Espenhain.

Districts
Mölbis - independent village until 1999, formerly infamous for being the most polluted village in the GDR, later in all of Europe ("der dreckigste Ort Europas") because of its vicinity to Espenhain lignite industry plants 
Espenhain
Oelzschau
Pötzschau

References

External links 
 www.roetha.de Official homepage of Rötha
 www.roetha-info.net Private portal of Rötha

Leipzig (district)